This is a list of members of the National Parliament of Papua New Guinea from 1992 to 1997, as elected at the 1992 election.

Notes

References

List
Papua New Guinea politics-related lists